Harold Leese (1886–?) was an English footballer who played for Bradford City, Crewe Alexandra, Port Vale and Stoke. He helped Stoke to win two minor league titles.

Career
Leese was born in Staffordshire and played non-league football with local sides Smallthorne and Goldenhill Villa, before he was signed up to league club Stoke. After playing for Golden Hill, he had a spell with Bradford City between July 1908 and May 1909, making one league appearance, before returning to Stoke in 1909. He scored 19 goals in 50 appearances in the 1909–10 season, and helped the club to win the Southern League Division Two A. He scored nine goals in 53 matches in the 1910–11 season, as the "Potters" won the Birmingham & District League title and finished second in the Southern League Division Two. He scored once in 14 games in the 1911–12 season, and featured six times in the 1912–13 campaign before departing the Victoria Ground. He moved to local rivals Port Vale in May 1913. He played regular football between September and December 1914, but then left to help his country fight World War II. He made two appearances whilst on leave, returning permanently upon his demobilization in April 1919. He left at the end of the 1918–19 campaign as he was unable to agree terms with the club, and so was not a part of the club when it gained re-election to the Football League in October 1919. Instead he joined nearby Crewe Alexandra, and later played for Goldenhill Wanderers.

Career statistics
Source:

References

Footballers from Stoke-on-Trent
English footballers
Association football defenders
Association football midfielders
Stoke City F.C. players
Bradford City A.F.C. players
Port Vale F.C. players
Crewe Alexandra F.C. players
English Football League players
Southern Football League players
1886 births
Year of death missing